Muhammad ibn Badr, commonly known as Jajarmi, was a 14th-century Persian poet and anthologist.

References

Sources
 

Iranian poets
14th-century Iranian people